Moresby can refer to:

Places
 Port Moresby, the capital of Papua New Guinea
 Moresby, Cumbria, England
 Low Moresby, a village in the parish of Moresby, Cumbria
 Moresby Parks, a larger village in the parish of Moresby, Cumbria 
 Moresby, Queensland, Australia
 Moresby, Western Australia, a locality near Geraldton
 Moresby Island, British Columbia, Canada
 Moresby Island (Gulf Islands), British Columbia
 Mount Moresby, British Columbia

Other uses
 Moresby (surname)
 , two ships of the Royal Australian Navy
 Moresby Hall, a Grade I-listed building in Cumbria 
 Moresby Parks railway station, a former station at Moresby Parks, in Moresby parish, Cumbria
 the Moresby Treaty, an anti-slavery treaty signed in 1822